Regīna Ločmele (born 1966) is a Latvian politician and former journalist. She is a member of Harmony and a deputy of the 12th Saeima.

References

1966 births
Living people
People from Sevastopol
Social Democratic Party "Harmony" politicians
Deputies of the 12th Saeima
Deputies of the 13th Saeima
Women deputies of the Saeima

21st-century Latvian women politicians